Sotra may refer to :
 Sahotra, a Chuhra caste in India and Pakistan
 Sotra, an archipelago in Norway
 Sotra Facula, a cryovolcano located on Titan
 SOTRA, the Abidjan transport company
 Šotra, a Serbian surname